Reky Rahayu (born 8 May 1993) is an Indonesian professional footballer who plays as a goalkeeper for Liga 1 club Persib Bandung.

Club career

Persita Tangerang
In 2013, Reky signed a contract with Persita Tangerang. Reky made his debut after he promotion to senior team of Persita Tangerang against Persib Bandung in 2013 Indonesia Super League. and in 2017 season, he returned to joined Persita Tangerang.

Persija Jakarta
In February 2016, Reky signed one-year contract with Persija Jakarta for plays in the 2016 Indonesia Soccer Championship A.

References

External links
 
 Reky Rahayu at Liga Indonesia

1993 births
Living people
Indonesian footballers
People from Tangerang
Sportspeople from Banten
Association football goalkeepers
Liga 2 (Indonesia) players
Liga 1 (Indonesia) players
Persita Tangerang players
Persija Jakarta players
Bandung United F.C. players
Kalteng Putra F.C. players
Persela Lamongan players
PSG Pati players
Persib Bandung players